Aftab Uddin Chowdhury, also known as Chan Miah, is a Bangladesh Muslim League politician, diplomat and the former Member of Parliament for the Mymensingh-10 constituency.

Biography

Chowdhury was born into a wealthy Bengali Muslim zamindari family in Dhampur, Bhaluka, Mymensingh District on 1 March 1913. His parents were Khan Sahib Abedullah Chowdhury and Halimunnesa Chowdhurani.

In 1948, Aftab Uddin Chowdhury was the founding secretary of the Bhaluka Pilot High School. He was a member of the 4th National Assembly of Pakistan from 1965 to 1969, representing the Pakistan Muslim League in the Mymensingh-VI constituency. The Dhaka-Mymensingh highway was built in the regime of Ayub Khan because of the proposal given by Chowdhury. He was elected to parliament for Mymensingh-10 as a Bangladesh Muslim League candidate in the 1979 Bangladeshi general election. He died on 24 July 1985.

References

Bangladesh Muslim League politicians
2nd Jatiya Sangsad members
Pakistani MNAs 1965–1969
1985 deaths
People from Bhaluka Upazila
1913 births